The Boomerang is a 1919 American silent drama film directed by Bertram Bracken. It stars Henry B. Walthall, Melbourne MacDowell, and Nina Byron, and is based on the novel of the same name by William Hamilton Osborne.

Cast

Preservation
A print of The Boomerang is preserved in the George Eastman House Motion Picture Collection.

References

External links

1919 films
American silent feature films
Films based on American novels
American black-and-white films
Silent American drama films
1919 drama films
Films directed by Bertram Bracken
1910s American films